Heinze Bakker (2 March 1942 – 16 April 2021) was a Dutch sports journalist.

References 

1942 births
2021 deaths
People from Heerenveen
Dutch sports journalists